The women's 200 metre breaststroke event at the 2008 Olympic Games took place on 13–15 August at the Beijing National Aquatics Center in Beijing, China.

U.S. swimmer Rebecca Soni pulled away over the final lap to capture gold and set a new world record of 2:20.22. Australia's world record holder and top favorite Leisel Jones enjoyed a strong lead in the first 100 metres, but ended up only with a silver in 2:22.05, almost two seconds behind Soni. Meanwhile, Sara Nordenstam earned Norway's second Olympic medal in swimming, as she powered home with a bronze in a European record of 2:23.02.

Austria's Mirna Jukić finished outside the medals in fourth place at 2:23.24, while Russia's Yuliya Yefimova set a national record of 2:23.76 to hold off Canada's Annamay Pierse (2:23.77) for a fifth spot by a hundredth of a second (0.01). Japanese duo Rie Kaneto (2:25.14) and Megumi Taneda (2:25.23) closed out the field.

Notable swimmers failed to reach the top 8 final, featuring Germany's Anne Poleska, bronze medalist in Athens four years earlier. Competing at her fourth Olympics, defending champion Amanda Beard placed eighteenth in 2:27.70, but missed the semifinals by 0.42 seconds.

Earlier in the prelims, Soni posted a top-seeded time of 2:22.17 to lead the heats, cutting off Beard's Olympic record by exactly two-tenths of a second (0.20).

Records

Prior to this competition, the existing world and Olympic records were as follows.

The following new world and Olympic records were set during this competition.

Results

Heats

Semifinals

Semifinal 1

Semifinal 2

Final

References

External links
Official Olympic Report

Women's breaststroke 200 metre
2008 in women's swimming
Women's events at the 2008 Summer Olympics